Mary Tsingou (married name: Mary Tsingou-Menzel; born October 14, 1928) is an American physicist and mathematician of Greek descent. She was one of the first programmers on the MANIAC computer at Los Alamos National Laboratory and is best known for having coded the celebrated computer experiment with Enrico Fermi, John Pasta, and Stanislaw Ulam which became an inspiration for the fields of chaos theory and scientific computing and was a turning point in soliton theory.

Life
Mary Tsingou was born in Milwaukee, Wisconsin, her Greek parents having moved to the US from Bulgaria. In the aftermath of the Great Depression, the family left the US to spend several years in Bulgaria. In 1940, they returned to the US, where Tsingou attended high school and college. She graduated in mathematics and education in 1951 from the University of Wisconsin. She then studied at the University of Michigan, receiving a master's degree in mathematics in 1955. In 1958, she married Joseph Menzel.

Career
Tsingou joined the T1 division of the Los Alamos National Laboratory, then transferred to the T7, where she became one of the first programmers on the MANIAC. Besides working on weapons, the group also studied fundamental physics. Following Fermi's suggestion to analyze numerically the predictions of a statistical model of solids, Tsingou came up with an algorithm to simulate the relaxation of energy in a model crystal, which she implemented on the MANIAC. The analysis became known in the computational physics community as the Fermi–Pasta–Ulam–Tsingou problem (FPUT), and Tsingou's contributions have since been recognised. The result was an important stepping stone for chaos theory.

After Fermi's death, James L. Tuck and Tsingou-Menzel repeated the original FPU results and provided strong indication that the nonlinear FPU problem might be integrable.

Tsingou-Menzel continued her computational career at Los Alamos. She was an early expert on Fortran. In the 1980s, she worked on calculations in the Star Wars program. She retired in 1991.

Recognition
In 2008, an article published in Physics Today called to rename the FPU problem to the FPUT problem to give her proper credit for her contribution. Subsequent publications referencing the FPUT problem reflect this change. In 2020, National Security Science magazine, published by Los Alamos National Laboratory, featured an article on Tsingou that included her commentary and historical reflections on the FPUT problem. The article was titled "We thank Miss Mary Tsingou" in reference to the acknowledgement that appeared on the title page of the original FPUT technical report from 1955.

Publications
 
 Joseph J. Devaney, Albert G. Petschek, Mary Tsingou Menzel. On the Production of Heavy Uranium Isotopes in a Very High Density Fast Neutron Flux (accessed Dec. 2012). Los Alamos Scientific Laboratory of the University of California, 1958; 17 pages.

See also
 Kathleen Antonelli
 Jean Bartik
 Adele Goldstine
 Mary Ann Mansigh
 Marlyn Meltzer
 Betty Holberton
 Frances Spence
 Ruth Teitelbaum

References

External links 
 Pioneer Women in Chaos Theory. Frank Y. Wang.
 The Fermi–Pasta–Ulam “numerical experiment”: history and pedagogical perspectives.  Dauxois, Peyrard and Ruffo.
 A not-so-mysterious woman, Los Alamos Monitor online.
 A wrong righted, Philosophy of Science Portal, A Venue for Discussions of Science, Philosophy and the Arts
 Mary Tsingou-Menzel Oral History

1928 births
Living people
American women mathematicians
Scientific computing researchers
Los Alamos National Laboratory personnel
Numerical analysts
American women physicists
20th-century American physicists
20th-century American mathematicians
20th-century American women scientists
21st-century American physicists
21st-century American mathematicians
21st-century American women scientists
American people of Greek descent
People from Milwaukee
Scientists from Wisconsin
Mathematicians from Wisconsin
20th-century women mathematicians
21st-century women mathematicians
American expatriates in Bulgaria